The Provisional Government of National Defence, also known as the State of Thessaloniki (Κράτος της Θεσσαλονίκης), was a parallel administration, set up in the city of Thessaloniki by former Prime Minister Eleftherios Venizelos and his supporters during World War I, in opposition and rivalry to the official royal government in Athens.

The establishment of this second Greek state had its origins in the debate over Greece's entry into the war on behalf of the Entente, as advocated by Venizelos, or a Germanophile neutrality as preferred by King Constantine I. This dissension soon began to divide Greek society around the two leaders, beginning the so-called "National Schism". In August 1916, as parts of eastern Macedonia were not defended by the royal government against a Bulgarian invasion, Venizelist officers of the Hellenic Army launched an Entente-supported coup in Thessaloniki. After a brief hesitation, Venizelos and his principal supporters joined the uprising and began the establishment of a second Greek government in the north of the country, which entered the war on the side of the Entente. The National Defence government endured until June 1917, when the Entente powers forced Constantine I to abdicate, and allowed Venizelos to return to Athens as Prime Minister of a unified country. Nevertheless, the establishment of the National Defence government deepened the rift of the National Schism, which would plague Greek political life for over a generation, and contribute to the Asia Minor Catastrophe.

Background: Greece 1914–1916

Greece had emerged victorious from the 1912-1913 Balkan Wars, with her territory almost doubled, but found itself in a difficult international situation. The status of the Greek-occupied eastern Aegean islands was left undetermined, and the Ottoman Empire continued to claim them, leading to a naval arms race and mass expulsions of ethnic Greeks from Anatolia. In the north, Bulgaria, defeated in the Second Balkan War, harbored revanchist plans against Greece and Serbia. The two countries were bound by a treaty of alliance which promised military assistance in case of a Bulgarian attack, but in August 1914, the danger would emerge from a different quarter altogether: the Assassination of Archduke Franz Ferdinand led to the declaration of war by Austria-Hungary on Serbia and the outbreak of the First World War.

Greece, like Bulgaria, initially maintained neutrality, but as the war continued, both warring camps began wooing the two countries. At this point the first rifts appeared among the Greek leadership: Prime Minister Eleftherios Venizelos, at the helm since 1910 of a modernising government looking towards the British and French models, supported entry in the war on the side of the Entente, while King Constantine I, who had been educated in Germany, married to Kaiser Wilhelm II's sister and a deep admirer of Prussian  militarism, anticipated a German victory. Aware that Greece was vulnerable to the British Fleet, he advocated a course of neutrality.

In early 1915 the British offered Greece "territorial concessions in Asia Minor" if it would participate in the upcoming Gallipoli Campaign. Venizelos supported this idea, but run into the opposition from the King and his military advisors. When Bulgaria mobilized against Serbia in September 1915, Venizelos ordered a Greek counter-mobilization and called upon the Anglo-French to establish themselves in Thessaloniki (then widely known as Salonica) as to aid Serbia. The King unconstitutionally dismissed Venizelos and the parliament, making the breach between the two men and their followers irreparable. The Liberals boycotted the December 1915 elections. In the same month, the French, with the permission of Venizelos, occupied Corfu, where the remains of the Serbian Army were gathered before being sent to Thessaloniki. The group acknowledged Venizelos as its leader, and began approaching officers of the Army and the Cretan Gendarmerie.

During the following year, Greece's official governments were hard-pressed to maintain the country's neutrality. On , the Bulgarian invasion of eastern Macedonia commenced, facing little resistance, since the Athens government refused to condone any firm action. This surrender of hard-won territories with only token resistance, outraged most Greeks. At the same time, the establishment of the exiled Serbian King and his government in Thessaloniki in April, the presence of 120,000 Serbian troops in the Macedonian Front, accompanied by threats from the Entente that he would install a Serbian prefect in the city, raised fears that the city would be handed over to the Serbians.

Uprising in Thessaloniki

Incensed by the successive humiliations and the Bulgarian advance in Macedonia, several Greek officers had flocked to Thessaloniki and volunteered to raise troops and join the Allies. The local Allied commander-in-chief, Maurice Sarrail, welcomed their initiatives, but little headway was made due to the opposition of the Greek government. On 16/29 August, the Lt. Colonel Konstantinos Mazarakis-Ainian tried to seize control of the 11th Infantry Division's mountain artillery battalion, and lead it to the front. This was opposed by Colonel Nikolaos Trikoupis, the chief of staff and acting commander of III Army Corps, who sent two companies to the artillery barracks at Mikro Karabournou that forced Mazarakis to abandon his attempt and withdraw from the barracks.

This incident sparked the flame of a wider uprising on the next day, by the city's pro-Venizelist officers. Under the command of Lt. Colonel Epameinondas Zymvrakakis, about 600 men of the Cretan Gendarmerie with three volunteer companies under Major Neokosmos Grigoriadis and thirty other officers blockaded the headquarters of III Corps. When a company under Colonel Vagias tried to break through the blockade, shots were fired that killed two gendarmes and wounded three others. In response, the Cretans fired back, killing or wounding three or four soldiers. The firefight was stopped by the intervention of French officers. Sarrail arrived on the scene soon after, and commanded all Greek officers who would not join the newly formed "National Defence Committee" uprising to be shipped to southern Greece. The loyalist troops were disarmed and interned in the hopes that they would join the uprising, but in the event most of them refused and had to be sent to southern Greece as well.

Establishment of the State of National Defence

Venizelos himself with his closest aides left Athens on 12/25 September, initially for his home island of Crete, and from there via Chios and Lesbos to Thessaloniki, where he arrived on 24 September/7 October. Four days later, on 28 September/11 October, he formed a provisional government under the supreme leadership of a triumvirate comprising himself, General Panagiotis Danglis and Admiral Pavlos Koundouriotis (the "Triumvirate of National Defence", Τριανδρία της Εθνικής Αμύνης).

On 29 September/12 October, Maj Gen Emmanouil Zymvrakakis was appointed Army Minister (replaced on December 6 by Maj Gen Konstantinos Miliotis-Komninos) and on October 3 Nikolaos Politis was appointed Foreign Minister. On 6 October other ministries, euphemistically called "General Directorates" were established:

 Themistoklis Sophoulis, Interior Minister
 , Finance Minister
 Thalis Koutoupis, Minister of National Economy
 , Justice Minister
 Georgios Averof, Education Minister
 , Transport Minister
 , Minister for Supply and Food Distribution
 , Minister for the Refugees
 Andreas Michalakopoulos, Minister for Public Estates and Resettlement

The first tasks of the new government were the establishment of an "Army of National Defence" to fight alongside the Allies, and the consolidation of its rule in as much of Greece as possible. The Provisional Government declared war on the Central Powers on 24 November 1916, and set out to recruit divisions for the Macedonian Front, something which was achieved with speed and often ruthlessness. Despite calls by some officers to abolish the monarchy and declare a Republic, Venizelos chose a more moderate path. He had declared: "we are not against the King, but against the Bulgarians".

The State of National Defence established control in Greek Macedonia, Crete and the northern Aegean islands; lands that were just recently liberated during the Balkan Wars. The reluctant and uneasy coexistence of the two Greek states was not destined to last, as the Noemvriana riots against Venizelists in Athens clearly illustrated that a rapprochement was now impossible. Early in 1917, the Venizelist state took also control of Thessaly, after clashes against the royal army of Constantine.

The division of the country lasted for 9 months. On 15 June 1917 an Allied ultimatum forced King Constantine to abdicate in favour of his second-born son, Alexander, and, with the rest of his family, leave the country for Switzerland. Venizelos returned to Athens, as head of a superficially reunified Greece, and led it to victory alongside the Allies in World War I, but also in its entanglement in the subsequent Asia Minor Campaign. As such, the immediate aims of the "National Defence" were met. But the revolution was also an expression of the wide rift between the quasi-Republican, progressive Venizelists and the conservative Royalists/Anti-Venizelists, and its outbreak marks also the beginning of the Greek National Schism which would leave a troublesome legacy to the country, as it continued in various forms up to the 1970s.

In popular culture
A popular song of the era celebrating the movement was performed by the musical Estudiantina of Smyrna named Tis aminis ta pedià (the lads of the Defence) or the Macedon.

The song was performed also in the film Rebetiko of Costas Ferris in orchestration of Stavros Xarchakos.

Notes

References

External links 
The Great War - Romanian & Greek Weapons of World War 1 feat. C&Rsenal
The Great War - Greek Rifles and Pistols of World War 1 feat. C&Rsenal
The Great War - A Crucial Test For Unity - Greece in WW1 I THE GREAT WAR Special
The Great War - King Constantine I of Greece
Serbia Is Invaded Once Again - The Entente Lands in Greece I THE GREAT WAR Week 63
Nivelle's Spring Offensive - Royal Conspiracy In Greece I THE GREAT WAR Week 131
The Merchant of Death - Basil Zaharoff I WHO DID WHAT IN WW1? -- The Great War
Russia's New Offensive - The Russian Women's Battalion of Death I THE GREAT WAR Week 153 -- The Great War

Provisional governments
1916 in Greece
1917 in Greece
Greece in World War I
Modern history of Greek Macedonia
Politics of Thessaloniki
Modern history of Thessaloniki
Eleftherios Venizelos
1910s in Greek politics